Roscher is a German surname. People with the name include:
 Wilhelm Georg Friedrich Roscher (1817–1894), German economist
 His son Wilhelm Heinrich Roscher (1845–1923), German classical scholar
 Alfred Roscher (born 1959), Austrian footballer
 Albrecht Roscher (1836–1860), German explorer

German-language surnames